The men's light welterweight (63 kg/138.6 lbs) Low-Kick division at the W.A.K.O. European Championships 2004 in Budva was the fifth lightest of the male Low-Kick tournaments and involved only four fighters.  Each of the matches was three rounds of two minutes each and were fought under Low-Kick kickboxing rules.

The tournament gold medallist was Gosan Ibragimov from Russia who defeated Milan Dragojlovic from Serbia and Montenegro in the final by unanimous decision.  Defeated semi finalists Soki Andros from Hungary and Toma Tomov from Bulgaria won bronze medals.

Results
These matches ended in a unanimous decision.

See also
List of WAKO Amateur European Championships
List of WAKO Amateur World Championships
List of male kickboxers

References

External links
 WAKO World Association of Kickboxing Organizations Official Site

W.A.K.O. European Championships 2004 (Budva)